Francisco Frías (died 10 Sep 1568) was a Roman Catholic prelate who served as Bishop of Ario (1544–1550).

Biography
On 4 Jun 1544, Francisco Frías was appointed during the papacy of Pope Paul III as Bishop of Ario. On 30 Jun 1544, he was consecrated bishop by Matteo Griffoni Pioppi, Bishop of Trivento, with Scipione Rebiba, Titular Bishop of Amyclae, and Bernardino Silverii-Piccolomini, Bishop of Teramo, serving as co-consecrators. He served as Bishop of Ario until his resignation in 1550.

References

External links and additional sources
 (for Chronology of Bishops)
 (for Chronology of Bishops)

16th-century Roman Catholic bishops in the Republic of Venice
Bishops appointed by Pope Paul III
1568 deaths